Local elections were held in Taguig on May 13, 2013, within the Philippine general election. The vote was for the elective local posts in the city: the mayor, vice mayor, two District representatives, and councilors, eight in each of the city's two legislative districts.

Mayoral and vice mayoral election
Incumbent Lani Cayetano is now on her first term as the mayor of Taguig. As prescribed by the Local Government Code, she is still eligible to run for the same office. On the other hand, another incumbent George Elias is now on his last term as the vice mayor of the city. Ineligible for reelection, Elias will no longer run for any position.

The incumbent mayor Lani Cayetano is running again for mayoralty office under the Nacionalista Party (NP) with his running mate Ricardo Cruz, Jr. Cayetano, a former congresswoman of the legislative district of Pateros-Taguig, was said to be the first youngest female official to hold office while Cruz is the Barangay Chairman of Lower Bicutan.

Former Councilor Rica Tiñga, the youngest child of retired Supreme Court Associate Justice Dante Tiñga is running for mayor as the nominee of the local party Kilusang Diwa ng Taguig. Her running mate is Councilor Carlo Papa, son of former mayor Ricardo Papa, Jr.

Other hand, the Liberal Party did not have a nominee for a representative running for mayor in Taguig, given the alliance agreement of Team PNoy between the Liberal Party and the Nacionalista Party.

It will be recalled that Dante Tiñga filed an election protest after losing to Mayor Ricardo Papa, Jr. in the 1998 election but it was dismissed by Pasig Regional Trial Court Branch 167 Judge Alfredo Flores.

Results
The candidates for mayor and vice mayor with the highest number of votes wins the seat; they are voted separately, therefore, they may be of different parties when elected.

Mayoral election
Parties are as stated in their certificate of candidacies.
Lani Cayetano is the incumbent.

Vice-mayoral election
Parties are as stated in their certificate of candidacies. Incumbent George A. Elias is in his third consecutive term and is ineligible to run

Congressional  elections

1st District

Arnel Cerafica is the incumbent. He faced off against Councilor Gigi Valenzuela de Mesa. Cerafica is also nominated by local party Kilusang Diwa ng Taguig.

 

 
 

Note: Result include Pateros.

2nd District

Sigfrido Tiñga is the incumbent but decided not to run in any position due to his personal reason.
Former representative Henry Dueñas Jr. will take his place to be a congressman. He will facing off against TV/movie director and Fort Bonifacio Barangay Chairman Lino Edgardo Cayetano.

City Council election
The top eight candidates each district won seats in the city council.

First district
Incumbent councilor Baltazar Mariategue is in his third consecutive term and is ineligible for reelection; his son Billy Ray ran for councilor. Incumbent councilors Carlo Papa and Gigi Valenzuela De Mesa are eligible to run for another term. However, Papa decided to run for vice mayor, while De Mesa ran for Congressman.

|-bgcolor=black
|colspan=5|

Second district
Incumbent councilors Ricardo Jordan and Aurelio Paulo Bartolome are in their third consecutive term and are ineligible for reelection; so Jordan's son Richard Paul ran, while Bartolome decided not to run in any other positions.

 

|-bgcolor=black
|colspan=5|

 NPC's Ricardo Gomez, Jr. is a candidate of Kilusang Diwa ng Taguig
 Marco Evangelista is a candidate of Nacionalista Party

References

2013 Philippine local elections
Elections in Taguig
2013 elections in Metro Manila